Michael J Whitley (died 2000) or Mike J Whitley was a naval historian with a particular interest in the Kriegsmarine, who wrote and maintained several reference works on warships. He was the son of Herbert and Marguerite Whitley and married to Rita. Whitley died in a diving accident in 2000.

Selected publications
 Battleships of World War Two: An International Encyclopedia, Weidenfeld Military, 2001, .
 Cruisers of World War Two: An International Encyclopedia, Naval Institute Press, 1996, .
 Destroyers of World War Two, US Naval Institute Press, 2000, .
 German Capital Ships of World War Two, Cassell, 2001, .
 German Cruisers of World War Two, Naval Institute Press, 1985, .
 German Destroyers of World War Two, US Naval Institute Press, 1992, .
 German Coastal Forces of World War Two, Arms & Armour, 1993, .

Year of birth missing
2000 deaths
American naval historians
American male non-fiction writers
Place of birth missing